The lesser rock shrew (Crocidura serezkyensis) is a species of mammal in the family Soricidae. It is found in Azerbaijan, Kazakhstan, Tajikistan, and Turkey.

References

Crocidura
Mammals described in 1929
Taxonomy articles created by Polbot